Of gods and girls is the solo album by rapper producer Mr. J. Medeiros. It was released in 2007.

Track listing
"Children" (featuring Tara Ellis)	
"Last Stars"
"My Own"
"Target Market"
"Holding On" (featuring Tara Ellis)
"K38"
"Apples Apples"
"W.A.N.T.S." (featuring Tara Ellis)
"Smile"
"Left Me" (featuring Tara Ellis)
"Brutus"
"The Balance" (featuring Tara Ellis)

References

2009 albums
Mr. J. Medeiros albums